Croom-A-Coochee is an unincorporated community in Sumter County, Florida, United States, located adjacent to the Croom Wildlife Management Area (WMA) near the Withlacoochee River. The official zip code is 33597, which is shared with Webster. In addition to the Croom WMA, Sumter County offers hunting in the Green Swamp, Richloam, and Half Moon Wildlife Management Area. A new area has opened at the northeast end of Lake Panasoffkee.

See also
Croom, Florida

External links
Croom a Coochie Park (Sumter County)

Unincorporated communities in Sumter County, Florida
Unincorporated communities in Florida